USS Black Hawk may refer to the following ships of the United States Navy:

 , a tinclad gunboat built as the New Uncle Sam. Sold to U.S. Navy in 1862 and commissioned as USS Uncle Sam then renamed USS Black Hawk.
 , a passenger liner originally the Rhaetia. Seized by US Army in 1917 and renamed Black Hawk.
 , Black Hawk-class destroyer tender 1913 to 1947.
 , an Osprey-class minehunter coastal.

References
 

United States Navy ship names